Sky High is a 2020 Spanish crime thriller film directed by Daniel Calparsoro, starring Miguel Herrán, Luis Tosar, Carolina Yuste, Patricia Vico, Fernando Cayo, Richard Holmes, Asia Ortega, Ayax Pedrosa and Dollar Selmouni.

Plot 
The plot follows the progression in the criminal career of Ángel, a young man from the Madrid suburbs, after he meets Estrella in a club.

Cast

Production
The film had a €4 million budget. Universal Pictures International Spain was the distributor of the film. The film was directed by Daniel Calparsoro whereas the screenplay was authored by Jorge Guerricaechevarría.

The eight-week long filming started by September 2019 in Madrid. Shooting locations included Madrid, Valencia and Ibiza.

Release 

The film was presented at the 23rd Málaga Spanish Film Festival (FMCE) on 22 August 2020.

The film was theatrically released in Spain on 18 December 2020.

Sequel 
In the wake of the acquisition of the film's streaming rights by Netflix, the intention to resume the fiction with an original series was reported. In October 2021, Netflix announced Luis Tosar, Asia Ortega, Álvaro Rico, Alana Porra, Patricia Vico, Ayax Pedrosa, Dollar Selmouni, Richard Holmes and Carmen Sánchez as cast members of the sequel series.

See also 
 List of Spanish films of 2020

References

External links
 

2020 films
2020 crime thriller films
Films set in Madrid
Films shot in Madrid
Films shot in the Balearic Islands
Films shot in Valencia
Spanish crime thriller films
2020s Spanish-language films
Vaca Films films
2020s Spanish films